Reimlingen is a municipality  in the district of Donau-Ries in Bavaria in Germany.

Notable people 
 Józef Wojaczek (1901–1993), Roman Catholic Priest, member of the Mariannhill Missionaries
 Paul Diethei (1925–1997), politician

References

Donau-Ries